Ask for the Moon is a 1991 Italian comedy drama film directed by Giuseppe Piccioni.

Cast 

 Giulio Scarpati as Marco
 Margherita Buy as  Elena Bacchelli
 Roberto Citran as  Francesco
 Daniela Giordano as  Daniela
 Massimo Lodolo as  Emilio 
 Sergio Rubini as  Hitchhiker

References

External links

1991 films
Films directed by Giuseppe Piccioni
Italian road comedy-drama films
1990s road comedy-drama films
1990s Italian-language films
1990s Italian films